The Basilisco chilote is a creature from Chilota mythology originating from the Chiloé Archipelago, in southern Chile.

The Basilisco chilote is described as having the crest of a rooster and the body of a serpent. It is hatched from an egg  that is incubated by a rooster and lives in a hole which it digs under a house. It feeds on the phlegm and saliva of the people who live in the house, causing the inhabitants to dehydrate and eventually die.

To kill Basilisco chilote, you must burn the egg as soon as it is laid and kill the chicken that laid it, to prevent further eggs from being laid. Once hatched the only way to destroy it is by burning down the house where it lives.

This myth is based upon myths of the Colo Colo and the basilisk, but borrows more from the tradition of the cockatrice, which itself draws from the basilisk.

See also
Chilota mythology
Colo Colo
Basilisk
Cockatrice
Hungry ghost
Mbói Tu'ĩ

References
 Martinez Vilches, Oscar, Chiloe Misterioso (in Spanish). Pub. Ediciones de la Voz de Chiloe (circa 1998)
 Mancilla Pérez, Juan (2006), Magia y brujería en Chiloé. Secretos de Mitología. Medicina Popular.. 74 p.. (from the Spanish version of Wikipedia.

Chilote legendary creatures
Legendary serpents
Mythological hybrids